Luciano Batista da Silva Junior (born 29 August 1999), known as Luciano Juba or simply Juba, is a Brazilian footballer who plays as a left back or left winger for Sport Recife.

Club career
Born in Serra Talhada, Pernambuco, Juba joined Sport Recife's youth setup in 2017, on loan from hometown side Serra Talhada. Initially an attacking midfielder, he was converted into a left back in the 2019 season.

Promoted to the first team ahead of the 2020 season, Juba made his senior debut on 28 January 2020, starting in a 1–0 Campeonato Pernambucano home win against Central. He made his Série A debut on 16 August, coming on as a half-time substitute for Sander in a 1–1 away draw against Atlético Goianiense. 

On 21 August 2020, Juba renewed his contract with Sport for a further three years. The following 7 April, he was loaned to Confiança until the end of the season, but was recalled on 26 July.

Career statistics

References

External links
Sport Recife profile 

1999 births
Living people
Sportspeople from Pernambuco
Brazilian footballers
Association football defenders
Campeonato Brasileiro Série A players
Campeonato Brasileiro Série B players
Sport Club do Recife players
Associação Desportiva Confiança players